Corydalis chelidoniifolia is a flowering plant in the poppy family Papaveraceae.

Many of the species in Corydalis contain other toxins and alkaloids like canadine, which blocks calcium.

References

chelidoniifolia
Plants described in 1902